Lyman is an unincorporated community in Lyman County, in the U.S. state of South Dakota.

History
Lyman was originally called McGill, and under the latter name was laid out in 1919. The present name is after the county in which Lyman is located.

References

Unincorporated communities in Lyman County, South Dakota
Unincorporated communities in South Dakota